Walter Hurschler (born 25 April 1959) is a Swiss skier. He competed in the Nordic combined event at the 1984 Winter Olympics.

References

External links
 

1959 births
Living people
Swiss male Nordic combined skiers
Olympic Nordic combined skiers of Switzerland
Nordic combined skiers at the 1984 Winter Olympics
People from Obwalden